Francis Peak, Elevation , was named in honor of an early pioneer, Esther Charlotte Emily Weisbrodt Francis, who contributed to the colonization of the Morgan Valley in Morgan county in Utah.

The summit is seasonally accessible by hiking, biking, recreational vehicles, and automobile. The unpaved roads are mostly one-lane, steep, switchbacked and cliff-hanging/rocky in spots, perhaps best handled by smaller 4-wheel drive vehicles. Views of the valleys below are spectacular. As of Summer 2021, Google maps proved accurate. Download your GPS plan beforehand since cell service on the mountain is sketchy, and there are unmarked side roads. Vehicles can access the peak via Skyline Drive in Bountiful and Farmington Canyon Road in Farmington. Camping sites, trails, small ponds, wildlife, and great vistas are part of this rugged natural setting.

Atop the peak are domed radar towers constructed in 1959 and operated by the Federal Aviation Administration and Air National Guard.

Elevation Dispute
U.S. Geological Survey lists Francis Peak as 9,547 feet above sea level. However, that was before the 1950s construction, adding two radar domes. The natural height there now is 9,515 feet. The base of the radar facility adds 55 feet, and the domes chip in 60 feet more for a total extra artificial height of 115 feet and a grand total of 9,630 feet above sea level.

See also

 List of mountains in Utah

References

External links

Mountains of Davis County, Utah
Mountains of Morgan County, Utah
Mountains of Utah
Tourist attractions in Morgan County, Utah
Tourist attractions in Davis County, Utah
Wasatch Range